The Ctenoluciidae (meaning "comb light family"), also known as pike-characins, are a small family of freshwater fishes from Panama and South America.

They have elongated, pike-like bodies, and several sharp and conical teeth.

Some of these fish, such as Ctenolucius hujeta, enter the aquarium fish hobby, often being labeled a "freshwater barracuda" or "freshwater needlefish", descriptions of fish that are both unrelated to members of this family.

Genera
The two genera in this group are:
Boulengerella (five species)
Ctenolucius (two species)

References

 Nelson, Joseph S. (2006). Fishes of the World. John Wiley & Sons, Inc. 

 
Fish of Central America
Fish of South America